Salil Bhatt is an Indian slide guitar player. He is the son of the fellow slide player and Grammy Award winner, Padmashree Vishwa Mohan Bhatt.

His latest album, Slide to Freedom 2 - Make a Better World, was nominated for a Canadian Juno Award.

Discography
Strings Of Freedom
Revitalise
Swar Shikhar
Sopaan
Slide to Freedom (Part I & II)
Out of the Shadows
Mumbai to Munich
Revival of Gavati
Relax
Karnatikas Veena Jugal-Bandi
Mohan's Veena

References

Hindustani instrumentalists
Indian guitarists
Living people
Slide guitarists
Musicians from Jaipur
Year of birth missing (living people)
Northern Blues Music artists